Nyawira A. Muthiga is an African conservation zoologist who is Director of the Western Indian Ocean Marine Science Association Marine Programme in Kenya. She is a conservation scientist for the Wildlife Conservation Society.

Early life and education 
Muthiga was born in Kenya, and spent part of her childhood in Dar es Salaam. She earned her undergraduate degree in biological oceanography in the United States. She completed her master's degree at the Florida State University, where she studied the impact of salinity on the photosynthesis of Siderastrea siderea. Muthiga returned to Kenya for her doctoral research, where she joined the University of Nairobi.

Research and career 
In 2000 Muthiga was elected President of the Western Indian Ocean Marine Science Association Board of Trustees (WIOMSA). She oversaw the growth of the WIMOSA internationally, building local chapters and networks. Muthiga worked for the Kenya Wildlife Service where she led the coastal and wetland programme. In this capacity, Muthiga was made of Chair of the Kenya Sea Turtle Conservation programme. She has worked to survey hundreds of different coral reefs on the Western Indian Ocean. 

Muthiga was a founder of the Wildlife Conservation Society coral reef programme, which researches and deploys programmes that can conserve coral reefs, as well as identifying novel ways to allow critical species to recover. The programme helps to protect 90% of the world's coral species and has surveyed almost 1,000 sites across the Indo-Pacific and Caribbean Sea. In 2007 Muthiga joined the World Commission on Protected Areas as the Kenya coordinator. She has argued that to preserve coral reefs, social and environmental scientists must work together. She believes that the orange-lined triggerfish may play a crucial role in maintaining health corals.

Muthiga was awarded the 2018 Banovich Wildscapes Foundation Award for Conservation Excellence (ACE) for her work on ocean conservation. In 2020 Eco Magazine named Muthiga as one of the world's top coral reef researchers.

Awards and honours 
 2005 National Geographic Society/Buffett Award for Leadership
 2018 Award for Conservation Excellence
 2020 Eco Magazine Top Coral Reef Researcher
 2020 Coral Reef Conservation Award

Personal life 
Muthiga is married to American marine biologist Timothy McClanahan. She met him in the 1980s, when McClanahan was on a study-abroad programme in Kenya.

Selected publications

References 

Living people
Year of birth missing (living people)
Women conservationists
21st-century Kenyan women scientists
21st-century Kenyan scientists
University of Nairobi alumni
Florida State University alumni